Chah Aduri (also Romanized as Chāh Ādūrī) is a village in Golestan Rural District, in the Central District of Sirjan County, Kerman Province, Iran. At the 2006 census, its population was 44, in 12 families.

References 

Populated places in Sirjan County